The Crested Soultz is a breed of fancy pigeon. Crested Soultz, along with other varieties of domesticated pigeons, are all descendants from the rock pigeon (Columba livia).

See also 

List of pigeon breeds

Pigeon breeds
Pigeon breeds originating in France